Brutality and Bloodshed for All is the eighth and final studio album by American punk rock musician GG Allin, recorded with his backing band the Murder Junkies. Released after his death in 1993, the first recording on Alive Records. All songs were written while GG Allin was in Michigan State Prison. Copies of the album come with a photograph of GG Allin from his viewing, alongside a copy of his birth and death certificates.

Track listing
All CD copies of Brutality and Bloodshed for All come with a bonus track (titled "My Sadistic Killing Spree") that is not found on any other version. Additionally, later CD reissues of Brutality and Bloodshed for All claim to have a completely different track listing, yet follows the same exact ordering as other versions, except for the appearance of the bonus track.

"Highest Power" – 0:59
"Kill Thy Father, Rape Thy Mother" – 2:25
"Anal Cunt" – 3:50
"Raw, Brutal, Rough and Bloody" – 2:05
"Shoot, Knife, Strangle, Beat, and Crucify" – 4:52
"I Kill Everything I Fuck" – 2:33
"Shove That Warrant Up Your Ass" – 2:54
"My Sadistic Killing Spree" – 2:00
"I'll Slice Yer Fucking Throat" – 2:05
"Terror in America" – 2:00
"Fuck Off, We Murder" – 2:29
"Take Aim and Fire" – 2:35
"Bastard Son of a Loaded Gun" – 2:17
"Legalize Murder" – 3:12
"Brutality and Bloodshed for All" – 3:26

All songs were composed by Allin/Weber except for: "Highest Power" by GG Allin; "Anal Cunt" and "Legalize Murder" by Allin/M. Allin; and "Fuck Off, We Murder" by Allin/Weber/Aaron.

Personnel
GG Allin – vocals
William Gilmore Weber III – guitar, backing vocals
Merle Allin – bass, backing vocals
Donald Saches – drums, backing vocals

On track 5: David Peel, Barbara Kitson, Kembra Pfahler, Johnny Puke – backing vocals

References

1993 albums
GG Allin albums
Albums produced by Don Fury
Alive Naturalsound Records albums